Qeshlaq-e Mazan, also known as Mazan, may refer to:
 Qeshlaq-e Mazan-e Olya